Bogdan Jozwiak (born 17 July 1970 in Poland) is a Polish retired footballer.

References

1970 births
Polish footballers
Living people
Widzew Łódź players
Wisła Płock players
Hapoel Tayibe F.C. players
Hapoel Kfar Saba F.C. players
Pelikan Łowicz players
RKS Radomsko players
Liga Leumit players
Association football midfielders
Polish expatriate footballers
Expatriate footballers in Israel
Polish expatriate sportspeople in Israel
People from Płońsk County